Squash  has been part of the World Games since 1997 and has been held at every edition since except in 2001.

Medals table

Medalists

Men

Women

Participating nations
A total of 45 nations competed in squash on all World Games :

 Argentina (1)
 Australia (6)
 Austria (2)
 Brazil (2)
 Belgium (2)
 British Virgin Island (2)
 Canada (5)
 China (1)
 Chinese Taipei (1)
 Colombia (3)
 Czech Republic (2)
 Denmark (1)
 Ecuador (1)
 Egypt (4)
 Spain (2)
 Finland (2)
 France (5)
 Germany (6)
 Great Britain (6)
 Guatemala (1)
 Guyana (1)
 Hong Kong (3)
 Hungary (5)
 India (2)
 Ireland (3)
 Italy (1)
 Japan (4)
 Jamaica (1)
 Kuwait (1)
 Latvia (1)
 Malaysia (4)
 Mexico (4)
 Netherlands (3)
 New Zealand (2)
 Pakistan (1)
 Peru (3)
 Poland (2)
 Romania (1)
 Russia (2)
 South Africa (2)
 South Korea (1)
 Switzerland (2)
 Sweden (1)
 Ukraine (2)
 United States (4)

See also
 World Squash Federation

References

 
World Games
Squash